= Magdalena Abakanowicz Bridge =

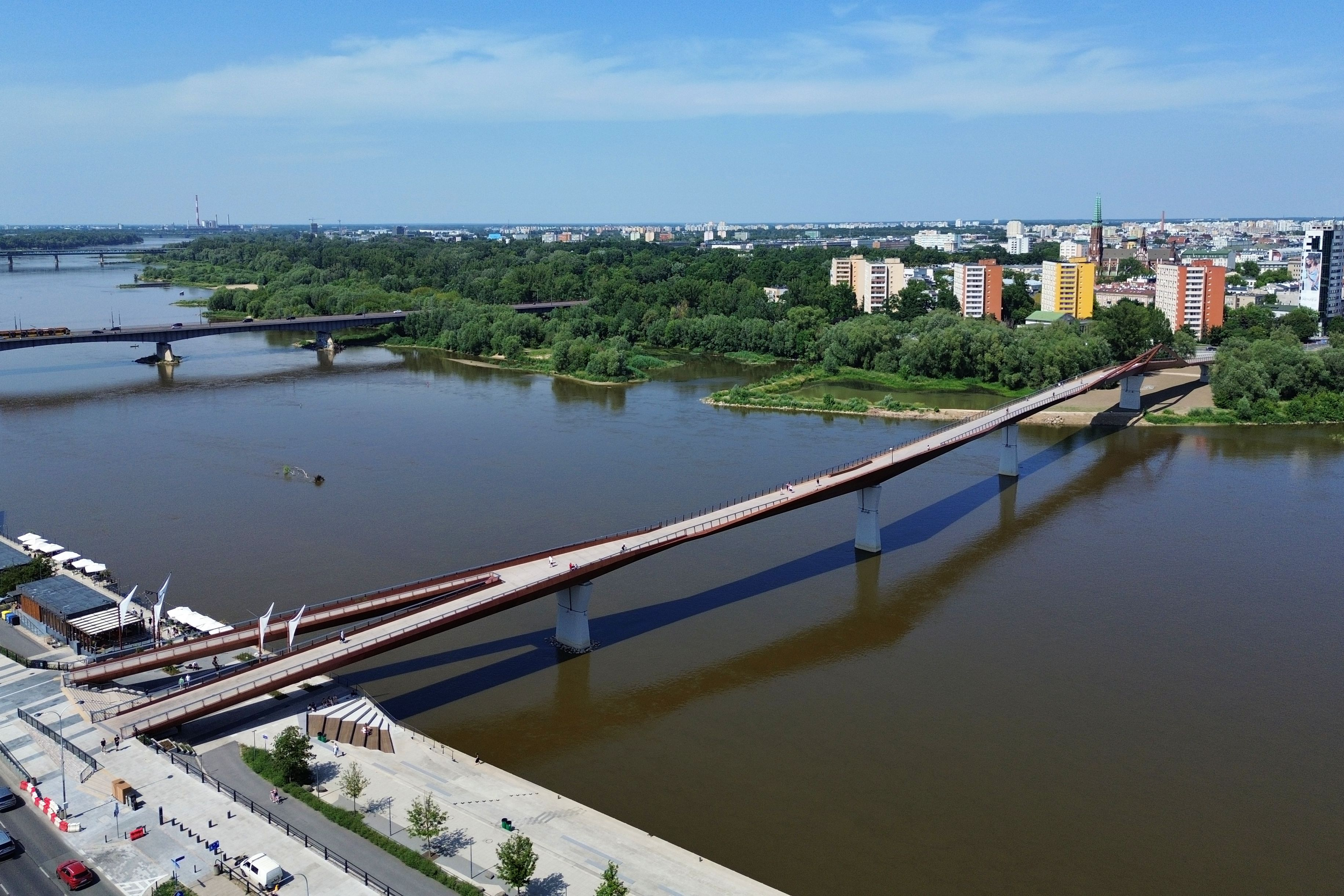
- Magdalena Abakanowicz Bridge in 2023
- Coordinates: 52°14′47″N 21°01′32″E
- Carries: Pedestrian, Bicycles
- Crosses: Vistula River
- Locale: Warsaw, Poland

Characteristics
- Total length: 452 metres (1,483 ft)
- Width: 16.3 metres (53 ft)

History
- Construction start: March 2022
- Construction end: 2024
- Opened: 28 March 2024

Location
- Interactive map of Magdalena Abakanowicz Bridge

The Magdalena Abakanowicz Bridge (Polish: Kładka Magdaleny Abakanowicz) is a pedestrian bridge, across the Vistula in Warsaw, Poland. The bridge is 452 meters long and 16.3 meters wide and is exclusively for pedestrians and bicycles. Construction on the bridge began in March 2022 and opened on March 28, 2024. This bridge connects Ulica Stefana Okrzei and Ulica Karowa. On August 28, 2025, the official name was decided to be 'Magdalena Abakanowicz Bridge'. Before its official name was established, it was called the Karova Bridge and the Vistula Pedestrian Bridge, etc. There are benches in the middle of the bridge where pedestrians can rest or watch the sunset, and busking also takes place.
